Kaltungo is one among the 11 Local Governments Area of Gombe State, Nigeria.
 
It has a landmark area of 881 km and a population of 149,805 according to 2006 census.

Festivals 

Pan-Mana Cultural Festival.

Postal Code 

The postal code of the area is 770.

Hospital 

The General Hospital Kaltungo served snakebite victims from Duguri District, Alkaleri LGA, Bauchi State, after a flood along the River Benue in October 2012 resulted in a large increase in the population of venomous snakes. A July 2013 report indicated that over 200 people in Duguri District had died of snakebite; "whoever is lucky to make it to Kaltungo is treated in only two days and then they return home."

Government 
The Current Local Government Chairman and Deputy Chairman are Faruk Aliyu Umar and Solomon Lande as deputy chairman respectively. They are both from All Progressives Congress.

Towns and Villages 
The administrative headquarters of Kaltungo Local Government Area is situated in the town of Kaltungo and the council is made up of districts and villages. Below are the list of towns and villages in Kaltungo:

Bagaruwa; Bwara; Daura; Dodonruwa; Dundaye; Garin Bako; Garin Barau; Garin Ilyasu; Garin Jauro Gambo; Garin Korau; Garin Nasara; Garkin Alhaji Mani; Jauro Gotel; Kausur; Kunge; Kuren; Kwabilake; Lankare; Lugayidi; Momidi; Sabon Layi Awak; Salifawa; Shelin Kuwe; Soblong; Tambirame; Tanga; Tore; Tudu; Unguwan Barebare; Yari

Snakebite Treatment and Research Centre, Kaltungo 
Kaltungo is well known for having various kinds of snakes in Northern Nigeria. This led to the establishment of Kaltungo Snakebite Hospital that was later upgraded to Snakebite Treatment and Research Centre, Kaltungo by the intervention of the office of the Sustainable Development Goals with the Gombe State Government.

Authorities of the Centre revealed that over 400 snakes of different varieties are being exported from the centre to Liverpool in England every month to help them extract venom from the snakes to produce drugs.

References
List of villages in Gombe State

Local Government Areas in Gombe State